Under the Lash is a 1921 American silent drama film directed by Sam Wood and starring Gloria Swanson. The film is based on the 1906 play The Shulamite by Claude Askew and Edward Knoblock, and the 1904  novel of the same name by Alice and Claude Askew. The film is lost with no copies of it existing in any archives.

Plot
As described in a film magazine, Deborah (Swanson), the second wife of intolerant and bigoted Boer farmer Simeon Krillet (Simpson), first learns of kindness from the Englishman Robert Waring (Hamilton) who comes to study farming from her husband. When her husband threatens to beat her for reading one of the Englishman's books Deborah tells him, to save him from the young man's wrath, that she is to become a mother. He desists and his cruelty turns to kindness. The disclosure of her fabrication brings renewal of his wrath and a determination to kill her. While attempting a rescue, the Englishman kills the husband. Subsequent complications are disposed of which allows a happy ending.

Cast
 Gloria Swanson as Deborah Krillet
 Mahlon Hamilton as Robert Waring
 Russell Simpson as Simeon Krillet
 Lillian Leighton as Tant Anna Vanderberg
 Lincoln Stedman as Jan Vanderberg
 Thena Jasper as Memke
 Clarence Ford as Kaffir boy

Reception
Upon its release, Under the Lash was not well received by audiences. It was the only Paramount Pictures film released in the early 1920s starring Gloria Swanson that did not do well at the box office.

References

External links

1921 films
1921 drama films
Silent American drama films
American silent feature films
American black-and-white films
American films based on plays
Famous Players-Lasky films
Films based on British novels
Films directed by Sam Wood
Lost American films
Films based on adaptations
1921 lost films
Lost drama films
1920s American films